The Bulletin on Narcotics is a publication of the United Nations Office on Drugs and Crime. First published in 1981, the bulletin provides a great deal of insight into the legislative history of the drug control treaties of the 20th century, including the earlier treaties as well as:
The 1961 Single Convention on Narcotic Drugs
The 1971 Convention on Psychotropic Substances
The 1988 United Nations Convention Against Illicit Traffic in Narcotic Drugs and Psychotropic Substances.

References
Bulletin on Narcotics Index of Issues.

Drug control treaties